Back to the World is the second album from punk band Street Dogs. The album was produced by Nate Albert, formerly of The Mighty Mighty Bosstones. "You Alone" and "Back To The World" were both released as singles with music videos.

Track listing
All songs by Nate Albert, Marcus Hollar, Mike McColgan, Johnny Rioux and Joe Sirois unless otherwise noted
 "Strike a Blow" – 3:01
 "You Alone" (Hollar, McColgan, Rioux, Sirois) – 2:57
 "In Defense of Dorchester" – 2:31
 "Back to the World" (Hollar, McColgan, Rioux, Sirois) – 2:44
 "Tale of Mass Deception" (Hollar, McColgan, Rioux, Sirois) – 2:56
 "Drink Tonight" (Hollar, McColgan, Rioux, Sirois) – 1:11
 "Stagger" – 2:54
 "White Collar Fraud" – 2:20
 "Patrick" – 2:57
 "Pull the Pin" – 2:38
 "Hands Down" – 3:06
 "Unions and the Law" (Albert, McColgan, Rioux) – 2:48

Credits
Mike McColgan – vocals
Johnny Rioux – bass
Marcus Hollar – guitar
Joe Sirois – drums

References

Street Dogs albums
2005 albums
Brass Tacks Records albums